SecureTribe is an iOS-based secure image-sharing and video-sharing app, designed from the ground up with end-to-end encryption.

SecureTribe is used by over 3.8 million users as an alternative to Instagram and Snapchat as a place to securely connect with family and friends and share photos without worrying about hackers stealing or interfering with the user's data.

SecureTribe allows users to create unique groups, called Tribes, where they can post pictures and videos, organized into albums. Users can then choose to enable this tribe to be visible publicly or only to approved friends. As the owner of a Tribe, you can allow or disable the ability for others to upload into your Tribe and/or save a copy of the files from your Tribe. No content can be shared or accidentally leaked from Tribe to Tribe; content can only be shared within the tribe. You can also choose to share content publicly. 

Users can subscribe to Tribes created by their friends and will see new posts in the What's New Timeline. Unless you are invited to a Tribe, other users will not know that that Tribe exists, allowing more privacy than other group messaging apps.

Technology

Use cases 
 Sharing artistic expression with friends without government censors
 Parent sharing baby pictures with friends and family 
 Bands/Models/Stand up comedians sharing VIP content with fans

See also 
 List of Image Sharing Websites

References

External links 
 

American photography websites
Online mass media companies of the United States
IOS software
Mobile software
Photo software
Video software